Basil Deacon Hobbs, DSO, OBE, DSC (20 December 1894 - 28 November 1965) was a British and Canadian aviator. He is the second most highly decorated pilot in Canada.

Early years

Hobbs moved to Canada with his family at age in 1900 at age 15. In 1915, he went to take flight training at the Wright Flying School in Dayton, Ohio.

First World War Service

In 1915, Hobbs Joined the Royal Naval Air Service as a flight lieutenant. During the war he was awarded the Distinguished Service Cross (1917), the Distinguished Service Order, and Bar to the Distinguished Service Cross that same year. While flying a Curtiss H-12 Large America flying boat, he was one of the few Canadian pilots to score a victory over a German Zeppelin L.43.

Interwar flying

In 1920, Hobbs joined the Royal Canadian Air Force. He resigned his commission in 1927 holding the rank of major. During this time, he was employed by the Canadian Air Board as a "certificate examiner".

Second World War Service

At Canada's entry into the Second World War, Basil was recommissioned as a group captain in the RCAF. Stationed in Dartmouth, Nova Scotia, he was employed in anti-submarine operations and training.

Death
Hobbs died on 28 November 1965 in Montreal and is buried in Greenwood Cemetery, Sault St Marie, Ontario.

Awards and honours

 Distinguished Service Cross 1917
 Distinguished Service Order 1917
 Bar to Distinguished Service Cross 1917
 Mentioned in Despatches 1917
 Officer of the Order of the British Empire
 Canada's Aviation Hall of Fame 1987
 Yukon Territory Order of Polaris

References

External links 

  http://www.collectionscanada.gc.ca/eppp-archive/100/200/301/ic/can_digital_collections/aviation/m116.htm

1894 births
Aviation history of Canada
Canadian World War I pilots
Canadian World War II pilots
Royal Canadian Air Force officers
Bush pilots
1965 deaths
Wright Flying School alumni
Canadian Companions of the Distinguished Service Order
Canadian Officers of the Order of the British Empire
Canadian recipients of the Distinguished Service Cross (United Kingdom)